Camille Archibald Baquet (1842 – November 28, 1924) was an American Civil War Union Army officer who served in the 1st New Jersey Volunteer Infantry regiment and was the author of the first history of the unit's brigade, the famed First New Jersey Brigade.

Biography
Baquet was born in Paterson, New Jersey, one of eight children born to Camille Baquet (or Baquett), a law professor and translator from Paris, and Harriet Stuart Lord, the daughter of English immigrants. He grew up in Burlington, New Jersey. He was mustered in as a private in Company I, 16th Pennsylvania Volunteer Cavalry on September 13, 1862. He served with the Pennsylvanians until April 1, 1863, when he was commissioned as a second lieutenant in Company A, 1st New Jersey Volunteer Infantry, filling an officer vacancy within the Company that had existed for over a month. He then served until June 23, 1864, when his enlistment expired by law, and he was honorably mustered out of Federal service. During his 14-month tenure with the 1st New Jersey, his regiment saw combat at the Battles of Chancellorsville, Gettysburg, the Wilderness, Spotsylvania, and Cold Harbor.

He later worked as a bookkeeper. In 1910, he published the work History of the First Brigade, New Jersey Volunteers (Kearny's First New Jersey Brigade) from 1861 to 1865, which chronicled the military history of his brigade. Until the year 2005, it was the only full-length work on that famed VI Corps unit.

He died in New Brunswick, New Jersey and was buried in the Saint Peter's Church Cemetery in Spotswood, New Jersey.

References

Baquet, Camille, History of the First Brigade, New Jersey Volunteers (Kearny's First New Jersey Brigade) from 1861 to 1865, 1910.
Bilby, Joseph G. and Goble, William C., Remember You Are Jerseymen: A Military History of Jersey's Troops in the Civil War, Longstreet House, Hightstown, June 1998. .
Stryker, William S., Record of Officers and Men of New Jersey in the Civil War 1861-1865, Trenton, New Jersey, 1876.

People of New Jersey in the American Civil War
Union Army officers
People from Paterson, New Jersey
1842 births
1924 deaths
Date of birth missing
American people of French descent
American people of English descent